James  Bernard, 2nd Earl of Bandon  (14 June 1785 – 31 October 1856) was an Irish  Conservative politician who sat in the House of Commons in three periods between 1806 and 1831 and in the House of Lords as a representative peer from 1835 until his death.

Bernard was the son of Francis Bernard, 1st Earl of Bandon  and his wife Lady Catherine Henrietta Boyle, daughter of Richard Boyle, 2nd Earl of Shannon. He was educated at St John's College, Cambridge.

Bernard died at Castle Bernard the age of 71.

Bernard married Mary Susan Albinia Brodrick, daughter of Rev. the Hon. Charles Brodrick, Archbishop of Cashel, at St. John's Cathedral, Cashel on 13 March 1809. He was succeeded by his son Francis.

References

External links
 

1785 births
1856 deaths
19th-century Irish people
Politicians from County Cork
Alumni of St John's College, Cambridge
Members of the Parliament of the United Kingdom for County Cork constituencies (1801–1922)
Fellows of the Royal Society
Irish representative peers
UK MPs 1806–1807
UK MPs 1807–1812
UK MPs 1818–1820
UK MPs 1820–1826
UK MPs 1830–1831
Bandon, E2
Earls of Bandon